Ondiniella is a fungal genus in the family Halosphaeriaceae.
 This is a monotypic genus, containing the single species Ondiniella torquata.

References

Microascales
Monotypic Sordariomycetes genera